Queen Victoria School (QVS) is a school in Fiji. It was established in 1906 in Nasinu to provide education to the sons of Fijian Chiefs. It later moved to Nanukuloa in Ra when World War II broke out; then the school was moved to Lodoni where the two schools QVS and RKS operated side by side before eventually moving to its current site at Matavatucou, Tailevu. It then accepted students from Fijian villages based on their results in a secondary entrance examination.

The school is run as an academic college, but there is an adjoining farm which provides food to the school and serves as a training ground. Students are taught basic skills like crop and livestock husbandry, and there is a small dairy unit. These sessions usually last for about three hours and take place on Saturday morning. There is a farm manager and some permanent labourers who live on the compound.

The school is equipped with a library, chemistry and biology laboratories, computer lab and playing fields. This school takes part in cadet training and march for the passout parade. In Fiji, it is well known for high discipline.

Queen Victoria School consists of four houses: VERATA (blue), REWA (yellow), BAU (green) and TOVATA (red).

The school has a chapel in a position high on a hill and overlooking the sea and surrounding hills. The services are mainly Methodist, but other denominations are catered for. There is a school choir that performs at the Sunday morning service. 

Rugby is a popular sport; ex-students have played in rugby teams in Fiji and abroad. The school has won the Deans Trophy for a record 23 times, the most number of wins in Dean's Rugby history. QVS is well known for partaking in the Secondary Schools Athletics meet, Secondary School Rugby League and the Deans trophy Rugby Cup.

Notable staff and students

 Bavadra, Dr Timoci - Prime Minister of Fiji 1987, ousted by the Rabuka coup of 1987.
 Bokini, Ratu Ovini, Late Turaga na Tui Tavua, former Chairman of Great Council of Chiefs
 Bole, Filipe - Former Minister for Education and former Deputy Prime Minister
 Cakobau, Ratu Sir George - former Governor-General of Fiji
 Cokanasiga, Joketani - Former Minister for Primary Industries
 Cavubati, Bill - heaviest Prop in international Rugby
 Cawaki, Joeli - Commissioner Western and Assistant Minister for Agriculture and National Disaster Management. 
 Delai, Adriu - Flying Fijians outside center
 Delana, Lagisoa Rabo, former Agricultural Tribunal, Independent Arbitrator, Commissioner Western, Minister for Fijian Affairs (ALTA) in Rabuka SVT Government
 Dimuri, Josefa - Senator and Minister for Information.
 Dolokoto, Mesulame - Former Headboy and rugby captain(2013), ACT Brumbies winger.
 Doviverata, Alifereti - Fiji Rugby Captain
 Ganilau, Penaia - former Governor-General of Fiji and first President of Fiji
 Iloilo(vatu) Uluivuda, Ratu Josefa - Senator and President of Fiji 2001 - 2009
 Kalou, Joeli - Cabinet Minister 1987, 1995, Senator 2000-2004 and former Government Whip and Leader of the House
 Lauti, Toalipi - former Prime Minister of Tuvalu
 Luveniyali, Waisea Fijian International Fly-half
 Malani, Ratu Wilisoni, Headboy 1940,Cricket Captain 1940, Fijian Chief-Turaga Gonesau, Medical Doctor, SVT-Ra Constituency Parliamentarian 1994-1999.
 Manueli, Paul - former Commander Royal Fiji Military Forces
 Mara, Ratu Sir Kamisese - first Prime Minister of Fiji and second President of Fiji
 Murimurivalu, Kini - Fijian International Fullback
 Nailatikau, Ratu Epeli - former Commander, Royal Fiji Military Forces (1982–1987), diplomat, Speaker of the Fijian House of representatives (2001–2006) and Minister for Foreign Affairs (2007), Interim appointee of the Bainimarama led Military Government for current President of Fiji. President of Fiji since 2009.
 Naupoto, Viliame - Interim Permanent Secretary for Fisheries and Forests. Acting Commander of the Royal Fiji Military Forces.
 Osbourne, Patrick - Otago Highlanders winger
 Qarase, Laisenia - Prime Minister of Fiji, 2000–2006, ousted by military
 Rabuka, Sitiveni - instigator of the coups of 1987, former Commander of Fiji Military, former Prime Minister of Fiji
 Ratuvili, Usaia - Chief Magistrate of Fiji
 Savu, Akuila - Chief Executive Officer and Managing Director of Air Pacific, Executive Chairman of Ports Authority of Fiji and Deputy Chairman of Yatu Lau Company.
 Senilagakali, Dr Jona - interim Prime Minister in 2006 military government
 Siwatibau, Svenaca - former Governor Reserve Bank of Fiji, Director of ESCAP, Fijian academic leader and civil service administrator
 Speight, Henry -  Brumbies and Wallaby winger
 Taga, Mosese - Fiji Rugby prop and Captain
 Tora, Apisai - Former Senator, Cabinet Minister, Leader of the Taukei movement and Trade Union leader
Tusiawau, George - Chief and Member of the Legislative Council
 Vatuvoka, Waisale - former Naitasiri and Fiji International Centre
 Vidiri, Joeli - former Fiji and All Blacks player, Bau House
 Vitusagavulu, Jesoni, Fijian Ambassador to the US & Canada
 Vocea, Peceli - Fiji's Ambassador to the European Union, Former PS Finance, Bau House Captain 1985
 Vuli, Naibuka - Fiji Rugby Captain
 Meli Derenalagi - Fiji Sevens player
 Waqabaca Kotobalavu - Former Fiji sevens player
 Tevita Ikanivere - Current Drua Super Rugby Team Captain

QVS
QVS
QVS
1906 establishments in the British Empire